Jagdeep Sidhu is an Indian film director, writer, screenwriter and dialogue writer associated with Punjabi and Hindi cinema. He has been nominated for seven awards for categories "Best Screenplay", "Dialogue", and "Direction" PTC Punjabi Film Awards, winning one "Best Debut Director" for the film Qismat (2019) and has been nominated for five Filmfare Awards Punjabi.

Filmography

Awards and nominations

References

External links
 

Living people
Punjabi-language film directors
Punjabi screenwriters
1983 births